was a district located in Shimane Prefecture, Japan.

As of 2003, the district had an estimated population of 57,333 and a density of 185.14 persons per km2. The total area was 309.68 km2.

Towns and villages 
Hikawa
Koryō
Sada
Taisha
Taki

Merger
On March 22, 2005 - the towns of Koryō, Sada, Taisha and Taki, along with the city of Hirata, were merged into the expanded city of Izumo.
On October 1, 2011 - the town of Hikawa was merged into the expanded city of Izumo. Hikawa District was dissolved as a result of this merger.

Former districts of Shimane Prefecture